Diederik Foubert (born 12 July 1961) is a Belgian former cyclist. He competed in the team pursuit event at the 1980 Summer Olympics.

References

External links
 

1961 births
Living people
Belgian male cyclists
Olympic cyclists of Belgium
Cyclists at the 1980 Summer Olympics
Cyclists from Antwerp